Zamazaan may refer to:

 Zamazaan (horse), racehorse and sire
 Zamazaan (racing sailboat)